Giullia Buscacio Vieira (born January 21, 1997) is a Portuguese Brazilian actress.

Biography 
Giullia was born in Funchal, the capital of Madeira Island, daughter of the Brazilian striker Júlio César Gouveia Vieira who played in Botafogo and clubs in South Korea and Hungary (Fehérvar FC)  and Adriana de Farias Buscacio. She was born when her father went to play at Club Sport Marítimo. Later, she lived for four years in South Korea. Korean telenovelas were responsible for awakening in Giullia the will to act. In addition to her native Portuguese, she is able to speak Korean fluently.

Career 

Her debut on television occurred in the year 2009, at the age of twelve, in the series A Lei e o Crime, transmitted by Rede Record. In 2012 she made the soap opera Balacobaco, also in the Rede Record, however, from an early age she showed an artistic vocation, producing some independent short films such as "O Menino Mofado".

Her most prominent role was in the soap opera I Love Paraisópolis, broadcast by Rede Globo, in which she played the rebellious and spoiled Bruna. In 2016 she joined the cast of the telenovela Velho Chico, where she lives her first primetime character, the romantic Olívia, where she forms a romantic couple with Gabriel Leone.

Yanna Lavigne would make the character of the indigenous Jacira in the novel Novo Mundo, but as she became pregnant, Giullia took the paper.

Filmography

Television

Film

References

External links
 

1997 births
Living people
People from Funchal
Portuguese people of Brazilian descent
Portuguese emigrants to Brazil
Brazilian television actresses
Brazilian telenovela actresses
Brazilian film actresses